The Brigade of Guards was an administrative formation of the British Army from 1856 to 1968. It was commanded by the Major-General commanding the Brigade of Guards and was responsible for administering the guards regiments.

After the Second World War the British Army had fourteen infantry depots, each bearing a letter. Infantry Depot A at Wellington Barracks was the headquarters for the five guards regiments.

In line with the reforms of the army, it was renamed as the Guards Division on 1 July 1968.

Units

 1st Battalion, Grenadier Guards (1656–)
 2nd Battalion, Grenadier Guards (1656–1994)
 3rd Battalion, Grenadier Guards (1760–1961)
 1st Battalion, Coldstream Guards (1650–)
 2nd Battalion, Coldstream Guards (1711–1994)
 3rd Battalion, Coldstream Guards (1897–1959)
 1st Battalion, Scots Guards (1660–)
 2nd Battalion, Scots Guards (1689–1994)
 1st Battalion, Irish Guards (1900–)
 1st Battalion, Welsh Guards (1915–)
 Guards Machine Gun Regiment (1917–1920)
 Composite Guards Parachute Battalion (1946–1948)
 Guards Independent Parachute Company (1948–1968)

References

External links
 Brigade of Guards

Infantry administrative brigades of the British Army
Military units and formations established in 1856
Guards Division (United Kingdom)